Shanmukha Srinivas, (born N. Shanmukha Srinivas) is an Indian actor and Kuchipudi dancer. who primarily works in Telugu cinema. He is starred in 20 feature films as a child artist. He played the lead protagonist in the daily soap Anveshitha.

Early life
He was born to N. SivaramaKrishna in Eluru, West Godavari, Andhra Pradesh, India.

Selected filmography

References

External links 
 

Living people
Male actors from Andhra Pradesh
Telugu male actors
Performers of Indian classical dance
Kuchipudi exponents
Nandi Award winners
Male actors in Telugu cinema
Indian male film actors
20th-century Indian male actors
20th-century Indian dancers
People from West Godavari district
People from Eluru
Dancers from Andhra Pradesh
Year of birth missing (living people)